Wilfrido Garay (18 July 1943 – 24 January 2015) was a Paraguayan footballer. He played in one match for the Paraguay national football team in 1967. He was also part of Paraguay's squad for the 1967 South American Championship.

References

External links
 

1943 births
2015 deaths
Paraguayan footballers
Paraguay international footballers
Association football forwards
People from San Pedro Department, Paraguay
Club Nacional managers